Thénac may refer to the following places in France:

 Thénac, Charente-Maritime, a commune of the Charente-Maritime département
 Thénac, Dordogne, a commune of the Dordogne département